Langar (Persian: لنگر) is an institution among Sufi Muslims in South Asia whereby food and drink are given to the needy regardless of social or religious background. Its origins in Sufism are tied to the Chishti Order.

Etymology
Langar is originally a Persian word, and later came into Urdu and Punjabi from it, and in Bengali as longor.

Religious meaning

Serving food to the needy has been a rich tradition among Sufis, especially of the Chishti Order.

There is extensive use of free food imagery and metaphor in Sufi writings. Sugar and other sweet foods represent the sweetness of piety and community with God, while salt symbolizes purity and incorruptibility. The transformation of the raw wheat to finished bread is used as an analogy for Sufi spiritual development.

Sufi ritual observances (dhikr) are concerned with remembrance of God through exaltation and praise. Singing, dancing, and drumming are commonly part of such rituals, as is sharing of food. The tradition of langar was also adopted by the Sikh community, where it goes by the same name.

Langar khana
Langar is distributed to all in a langar khana. In a large dargah there are two degs (cauldrons for cooking food) on either side of the saham chiragh (courtyard lamp) fixed into solid masonry in which a palatable mixture of rice, sugar, ghee (butter) and dried fruits is cooked for distribution to the public as tabarruk. The circumference at the edge of the larger cauldron is 10-1/4 feet. It cooks 70 mounds of rice, while the smaller deg takes 28 mounds. In the dergah at Ajmer, one of them was presented by Emperor Akbar in 1567 CE. The princes or the well-to-do pilgrims order these degs to be cooked generally during the Urs period.

The langar khana at Ajmer
Bari Deg: Inside the Sahan-e-Chiragh and on the right side of Buland Darwaza is located Bari Deg. Emperor Akbar pledged to visit Ajmer Sharif on foot and presented a large cauldron if victorious in Chittaurgarh battle. So he kept his words after winning the battle. The circumference of the cauldron (Deg) is 12.5 yards and 125 mounds of rice can be cooked in it at a time.

Chhoti Deg: It is located on the left side of Buland Darwaza inside Sahan-e-Chiragh. Eighty mounds of rice can be cooked in it at a time.

References

Sufism in India
Free meals
Alms in Islam
Almshouses